Jonathan Charles Palmer (born 7 November 1956) is a British businessman and former Formula One racing driver. Before opting for a career in motor racing, Palmer trained as a physician at London's Guys Hospital. He also worked as a junior physician at Cuckfield and Brighton hospitals.

He is currently the majority shareholder and Chief Executive of MotorSport Vision (MSV), a company that runs six UK motorsport circuits, the PalmerSport corporate driving event at Bedford Autodrome and several racing championships including British Superbikes and GB3.

Prior to his business life, Palmer was active in Formula One between 1983 and 1989, and drove for Tyrrell, Williams, RAM, and Zakspeed. He won 14 Championship points from 83 starts.  He also raced a Group C Porsche in sports car events between 1983 and 1990, winning the 1984 1000 km of Brands Hatch with co-driver Jan Lammers and taking second place at the 1985 24 Hours of Le Mans with co-drivers James Weaver and Richard Lloyd.

Palmer helped develop the McLaren F1 road car, and drove one to a new speed record for production cars.

Racing career

Early career
Following his education at Brighton College, Palmer raced an Austin Healey Sprite and a Marcos in club events while he was a medical student at Guy's Hospital. He went on to work as a doctor at Cuckfield and Brighton hospitals, and opted for a professional driving career after he had participated in Formula Ford from 1978 to 1980. He won the British Formula 3 Championship in 1981, and landed a Williams Formula One test drive in 1982. The following year he won the European Formula Two Championship, and the British Racing Drivers' Club awarded him their Gold Star.

Formula One

Palmer joined Williams as a test driver for the 1982 and 1983 seasons whilst racing in F2, and made his Formula One debut at Brands Hatch on 25 September 1983, driving a Williams in the European Grand Prix. This drive was a 'thank you' from Frank Williams and Patrick Head. He finished 13th out of 26 starters. Moving to the Skoal Bandit RAM March team in 1984, his six finishes yielded one 8th place, three 9th, one 10th, and one 13th. He joined Zakspeed in 1985, starting in eight races and retiring from all except the 1985 Detroit Grand Prix, where he finished 11th. Sixteen starts with the same team in 1986 resulted in eight retirements and a best finish of 8th in Detroit.

In 1987, Palmer talked with McLaren boss Ron Dennis about becoming the team's No. 2 driver to double World Champion Alain Prost. Dennis ultimately signed Stefan Johansson, and Palmer joined Tyrrell a week before the season's opening race in Brazil. Although outpaced by its turbocharged competitors, Tyrrell's naturally-aspirated Cosworth-powered car proved reliable, and it was nimble on tighter circuits. Palmer won championship points in three races, and it was in the Australian Grand Prix that he achieved his career-best fourth-place finish. He also won the Jim Clark Cup, a championship for drivers of normally aspirated cars. He stayed with Tyrrell for the next two seasons, during which his best results were two 5th-place finishes and three 6th. At the end of 1989 he signed as McLaren's test driver.

Sportscars
Between 1983 and 1990 Palmer competed in the World Sportscar Championship at the wheel of a Group C Porsche. With co-driver Jan Lammers he won the 1984 1000 km of Brands Hatch. At Le Mans, his best result from five starts was second place in 1985, with co-drivers James Weaver and Richard Lloyd.

Post F1
In 1991 Palmer came seventh in the British Touring Car Championship, driving a Prodrive BMW. Also that year he became a pit lane reporter for the BBC F1 commentary team. Following James Hunt's death from a heart attack after the 1993 Canadian Grand Prix, Palmer joined the BBC commentary box alongside Murray Walker. At the end of 1996 the BBC lost the rights to broadcast F1, and in 1997 Palmer joined the CBC for its annual commentary on the Grand Prix of Canada.

Road car development
Palmer's work with McLaren included development of the McLaren F1 road car, and he drove one to a record-breaking 231 mph at the Nardo test track.

Business career
PalmerSport was founded in 1991 to run corporate hospitality motorsport events. This was initially run from the Bruntingthorpe airfield in Leicestershire before the lease was acquired to develop the site now known as Bedford Autodrome.

Palmer opened the venue in 1999 as four separate circuits with a total of six miles of track, to become the permanent home for PalmerSport. The venue is also used for trackdays.

Palmer launched the Formula Palmer Audi Championship in 1998 as a less costly alternative to Formula 3. Inaugural champion Justin Wilson went on to win the Formula 3000 championship. With Palmer managing his career, an innovative share issue in Wilson helped him secure a Formula One drive with Minardi.

In 2004, Palmer, John Britten, and Sir Peter Ogden acquired the Brands Hatch, Oulton Park, Snetterton and Cadwell Park circuits from Octagon, under the umbrella of MotorSport Vision (MSV). The company has turned around the fortunes of each circuit, and implemented a programme of improvements at each venue to develop better facilities for spectators and circuit users. Snetterton in particular has been revitalised under MSV ownership, with the circuit undergoing a near total redesign in 2011, with several new corners allowing for three different circuit configurations, and the addition of large spectator viewing areas.

The company, with Palmer as Chief Executive, organised the Formula Palmer Audi Championship, acquired the commercial rights for the British Superbike Championship, and secured the right to operate the FIA Formula Two Championship from 2009 to 2012. It now runs the GB3 and GB4 Championships, as well as several other club series and championships under the MSVR banner.

In 2009, MSV acquired the freehold of 800 acres of the Bedford Autodrome site and opened Bedford Aerodrome as a CAA licensed airfield in 2010.

MSV completed the freehold purchase of a substantial former military airbase near Laon in north-east France in 2015, which is planned to be developed into a major international motorsports complex.

In 2017 MSV acquired the Donington Park motor racing circuit, and implemented a multi-million pound program of improvements at the East Midlands track  including a new bar, cafe and restaurant, a new circuit office, extensive resurfacing of paddock areas and internal roads and a new grandstand with views of the track.

Personal life
Palmer's two sons have both had successful motor racing careers. Jolyon Palmer, the 2014 GP2 Series champion, drove for RenaultSport F1 Team during the 2016 and 2017 seasons and is now a commentator and columnist for BBC Sport F1. Jonathan's younger son Will Palmer won the BRDC F4 Championship and the prestigious McLaren Autosport BRDC Award in 2015, and finished second in Renault Eurocup in 2017. 

Palmer also has two daughters: Emily, an accountant, and Alice, a professional equestrian showjumper.

Palmer married Emma Collins in 2018, having separated from his first wife, Gill, in 2011.

Racing record

Career summary

† 1st place in the Jim Clark Cup, for naturally aspirated cars.

Complete European Formula Two Championship results
(key) (Races in bold indicate pole position; races in italics indicate fastest lap)

Complete Formula One results
(key) (Races in italics indicate fastest lap)

† 1st place in the Jim Clark Cup, for naturally aspirated cars.

Complete British Saloon / Touring Car Championship results
(key) (Races in bold indicate pole position – 1983 in class) (Races in italics indicate fastest lap – 1 point awarded 1983 all races, 1983 in class)

 – Race was stopped due to heavy rain. No points were awarded.

Complete European Touring Car Championship results
(key) (Races in bold indicate pole position) (Races in italics indicate fastest lap)

† Not eligible for points.

Complete 24 Hours of Le Mans results

References

External links

MotorSport Vision
Brighton College Hall of Fame
GP Encyclopedia
Palmer Sport

BBC sports presenters and reporters
English racing drivers
English Formula One drivers
Williams Formula One drivers
RAM Racing Formula One drivers
Zakspeed Formula One drivers
Tyrrell Formula One drivers
1956 births
Living people
People from Lewisham
European Formula Two Championship drivers
British Formula Three Championship drivers
FIA European Formula 3 Championship drivers
British Touring Car Championship drivers
BRDC Gold Star winners
People educated at Brighton College
24 Hours of Le Mans drivers
World Sportscar Championship drivers
Mercedes-AMG Motorsport drivers
BMW M drivers
Team Joest drivers
Sauber Motorsport drivers